Visigothic script was a type of medieval script that originated in the Visigothic kingdom in Hispania (the Iberian Peninsula, modern Andorra, Spain and Portugal). Its more limiting alternative designations littera toletana and littera mozarabica associate it with scriptoria specifically in Toledo and with Mozarabic culture more generally, respectively.

The script, which exists in book-hand and cursive versions, was used from approximately the late seventh century until the thirteenth century, mostly in Visigothic Iberia but also somewhat in southern France. It was perfected in the 9th–11th centuries and declined afterwards. It developed from uncial script, and shares many features of uncial, especially an uncial form of the letter .

 
There are two forms of the letter , one with a straight vertical ascender and another with an ascender slanting towards the left. The letters  and  also have many different forms when written in ligature. Of particular interest is the special Visigothic z , which, after adoption into Carolingian handwriting, eventually transformed into the c-cedilla .

From the standard script, a capital-letter display script was developed, with long slender forms. There was also a cursive form that was used for charters and non-religious writings, which had northern ("Leonese") and southern ("Mozarabic") forms. The Leonese cursive was used in the Christian north, and the Mozarabic was used by Christians living in the Muslim south. The cursive forms were probably influenced by Roman cursive, brought to Iberia from North Africa.

Visigothic script has many similarities with Beneventan script and Merovingian script.

See also
Verona Orational

Further reading
 'Fonts for Latin Paleography: User's Manual. 5th edition' A manual of Latin paleography; a comprehensive PDF file containing 82 pages profusely illustrated, 2 January 2017).
 Littera Visigothica, blog specialized in Visigothic script
 Visigothic Minuscule on Medieval Writing

 
 
 
 
 
 
 
 
 
 
 
 

Latin-script calligraphy
Medieval scripts
Western calligraphy
Writing systems introduced in the 7th century
13th-century endings